Vidas prestadas is a 2000 telenovela produced by Iguana Producciones. The telenovela is Peruvian   was written by Alfonso Pareja. Grecia Colmenares, Luis José Santander,  Sonia Oquendo, Carlos Tuccio and Jesús Delaveaux starred in the telenovela.

Plot
This is the story of two people brought together by fate. Fernanda suffers on the day of her wedding when her fiancé abandons her at the altar. Heartbroken, she becomes cold and distant and begins to mistrust men, though she doesn't know of her mother's involvement in paying off her fiancé Fabián not to marry her. On the other hand, José María 'Chema' Rivero lives in Paraguay when he gets into trouble with the law. He seeks help from his friend Marcos who along with his mother is leaving the country for Peru and they decide to take Chema with them. However, their plane crashes and Chema is the only survivor. Due to a confusion, Chema is mistaken to be Marcos, and he decides to use the opportunity and keep using his dead friend's identity from now on. Chema will discover he has two cousins, Renato and Fernanda. One will become his worst enemy while the other will become his greatest love.

Cast
Grecia Colmenares as  Fernanda Valente López
Luis José Santander as José María 'Chema' Rivero
Sonia Oquendo as Joanna López de Valente
Carlos Tuccio as Édgar Valente
Jesús Delaveaux as Federico Galindo
Toño Vega as Ramón 'Moncho' Vidales Gringas
María Pía Ureta as Diana Virgil
Vanessa Terkes as Kathy Vigas
Karina Calmet as Elisa Galindo
Bernie Paz as Renato 'Renny' Valente López
Ernesto González Quattrini as Antonio 'Tony' Ortega
Cécica Bernasconi as Becky Lipton
María José Zaldívar as Felicia Sánchez Viscero
Carlos Carlín as Mauricio Virgil
Baldomero Cáceres as Gary
Mónica Sáenz as Ángela Ruiz
Janet Murazzi as Irma
Silvestre Ramos as Néstor Gardenia
Javier Echevarría Escribens as Marcos Quiroga
Patricia Frayssinet as Graciela Quiroga
Marcelo Oxenford as Óscar Salinas
Karlos Granada as Lorenzo
Júlio Andrade as Adrián González Chávez
Gabriel Calvo as Germán Viterio
Antonio Dulzaides as Michael Gouber
Diego La Hoz as Carlos
Maryloly López as Nurse
Elsa Olivero as Raquel Iturbe
Paul Vega as Fabián Montero

References

External links

2000 telenovelas
Venevisión telenovelas
2000 Venezuelan television series debuts
Venezuelan telenovelas
2001 Venezuelan television series endings
Spanish-language telenovelas
Peruvian telenovelas
2000 Peruvian television series debuts
2001 Peruvian television series endings